mRNA export factor is a protein that in humans is encoded by the RAE1 gene.

Mutations in the Schizosaccharomyces pombe Rae1 and Saccharomyces cerevisiae Gle2 genes have been shown to result in accumulation of poly(A)-containing mRNA in the nucleus, suggesting that the encoded proteins are involved in RNA export. The protein encoded by this gene is a homolog of yeast Rae1. It contains four WD40 motifs, and has been shown to localize to distinct foci in the nucleoplasm, to the nuclear rim, and to meshwork-like structures throughout the cytoplasm. This gene is thought to be involved in nucleocytoplasmic transport, and in directly or indirectly attaching cytoplasmic mRNPs to the cytoskeleton. Alternatively spliced transcript variants encoding the same protein have been found for this gene.

Interactions
RAE1 has been shown to interact with NUP98.

References

Further reading